Óláfs saga Tryggvasonar en mesta or The Greatest Saga of Óláfr Tryggvason 
is generically a hybrid of different types of sagas and compiled from various sources in the fourteenth century, but is most akin to one of the kings' sagas. It is an extended biography of King Óláfr Tryggvason and relates in detail the conversion to Christianity of Óláfr Tryggvason and Hallfreðr vandræðaskáld.
Composed around 1300 it takes Óláfs saga Tryggvasonar in Snorri Sturluson's Heimskringla as its base but expands the narrative greatly with content from the previous biographies of the king by Oddr Snorrason and Gunnlaugr Leifsson as well as less directly related material.

The saga is preserved in a number of manuscripts which can be divided into two groups; an earlier redaction preserved in the manuscripts AM 53 fol., AM 54 fol., AM 61 fol., Bergsbók and Húsafellsbók. The second group is a later redaction preserved in AM 62 fol. and Flateyjarbók.

The saga incorporates a number of þættir and shorter sagas, some preserved nowhere else.

Manuscripts 
 AM 53 fol.
 AM 54 fol.
 AM 61 fol.
 GKS 1005 fol. (Flateyjarbók)
 Stock. Perg. fol. no. 1 (Bergsbók)

Editions

See also
Óláfs saga Tryggvasonar, for other versions of the king's saga
Óláfsdrápa Tryggvasonar, poem in the Bergsbók

References

External links
The Saga of King Olaf Tryggwason An 1895 English translation (also at the Internet Archive)
Hèr hefr upp Sögu Ólafs konúngs Tryggvasonar Text based primarily on AM 61 fol. (Also here, in modern Icelandic spelling)

Kings' sagas
Flateyjarbók